Witch on the Holy Night (known in Japan as  and sometimes shortened as Mahoyo) is a Japanese visual novel developed and published by Type-Moon. It was first released for Windows on April 12, 2012 in Japan. An enhanced version with voice acting was released by Aniplex worldwide for Nintendo Switch and PlayStation 4 on December 8, 2022. The gameplay is largely a kinetic novel: the player experiences a linear plotline with little variation or player choices. The game is a prequel to Tsukihime.

An anime film adaptation by Ufotable has been announced.

Plot
Near the end of the Shōwa era, in Misaki town, an old mansion is rumored to be the home of a witch. After moving there, Aoko Aozaki begins to learn sorcery from a young mage, Alice Kuonji, the rumored witch of the mansion. The Aozaki family oversees the land on which Misaki is built and the heir (Aoko) is tasked with protecting it. Mysterious intruders have been disrupting the bounded field in Misaki, leading Alice and Aoko to investigate. A mannequin or puppet attacks them and is incinerated. As this happens, both of them spot someone running away, a civilian who must not get away having seen magic alive. Unexpectedly, a young boy named Sōjūrō Shizuki is drawn to the mansion and comes to reside with them as well. Eventually, it is revealed that the intruder who had been disrupting the bounded field is Touko Aozaki, Aoko's older sister. She, having killed their grandfather, now seeks to unveil the Aozaki's path to the root.

Characters

Main characters

 The first protagonist of the story and a high school student who has just begun to learn sorcery after moving into an old mansion where a witch was rumored to live. At school, she is the student council president. Aoko first appeared as a minor character in Tsukihime and its sequels Kagetsu Tohya and Melty Blood, and has appeared in several other non-Tsukihime-related Type-Moon games and media such as Fate/Extra.

 A natural-born witch, the daughter of the elder son of the wealthy Kuonji family and a witch he fell in love with, who lives alone in a mansion. She is emotionally detached and self-abusive, thus she does not form relationships easily but gradually comes to accept Aoko as a friend. She has been acquainted with the Aozaki family for over ten years and serves as Aoko's partner and teacher.

 The second protagonist of the story and a young man from a rural location who is still adjusting to living in the city and as a normal high school student. He is quiet and reserved, but warm-hearted and stable in contrast to Aoko and Alice. He winds up living at the Kuonji mansion as well, despite Alice's attempts to drive him away by ignoring him, and Alice develops uncertain feelings toward him.

Supporting characters

 The popular vice-president of the Student Council, a classmate of Aoko who becomes Sojuro's best friend. He and Aoko were close friends as children, though they both deny having any feelings for one another. His family life is apparently complicated and he is known to casually smoke and spend nights out. Tobimaru happens to have unrequited feelings for Kojika Kumari.

 The treasurer of the Student Council, a friend and classmate of Aoko who possesses a cool-mannered and realistic personality. She is very responsible as a result of being in charge of a household of brothers, but she dislikes how the men in her life look down on her. Though her father disapproves of her desire to attend college, Kojika still works hard to save money to attend anyway.

 A classmate of Sojuro, Hosuke is a cheerful young man whose primary interests are the attractive girls in class and becoming rich someday. He often tries to organize the male students in class, though his cunning often fails and the girls wind up pitying him instead. He is also Sojuro's co-worker at their part-time job.

 Aoko's older sister, regarded as a genius magus in the Aozaki family, who believed that their magical lineage was dying out. She and Aoko never get along particularly well. Alice enjoys Touko's company because she is a person who can truly understand Alice, though Alice does little to stop Aoko and Touko from fighting. Touko has appeared in Kara no Kyōkai as a supporting character.

 The antagonist of the story, an ageless nature spirit whose true form is a golden werewolf, though he appears as a fair-haired young boy. His existence is similar to the True Ancestors that appeared in Tsukihime. Other werewolves once revered him as the werewolf who would revive their race, but was ostracized and later sold to Touko Aozaki when it became apparent he was not a true werewolf. He is badly injured in mortal combat with Sōjūrō, who destroys his heart with two concentrated blows. As Lugh is immortal, he easily regenerates, but the horrific nature of the wound, the pain he suffered from the injury and subsequent regeneration, and Sōjurō's bizarre nature cause Lugh to become catatonic with fear and be emotionally reduced to the child he appears to be.

 An idol singer who has travelled around the world, May is also a mage with an eccentric personality. She is acquainted with Sojuro by unknown means and is known by the church. As a mage, her ability is considerable enough to cause trouble for Lugh.

 A member of the Mage's Association, though she has only been part of the organization for a year after leaving the Church. It is believed that Ritsuka is apprenticed to the Aozaki family to act as a watchdog, which is why Aoko is suspicious of Ritsuka's intentions.

 Ritsuka's twin sister, a member of the church well-known in town as a pious nun. She possesses a genetic condition that results in heightened senses and is skilled in rougher acts as well.

A member of the Church. Despite his gentle personality, his advice is often critical and harsh. He was once apprenticed to the Aozaki family and happens to be Touko's old lover. Because he was strong enough to kill a witch, Touko remains vigilant around him.

Development and release
Kinoko Nasu was inspired in late 1995 by the first episode of Neon Genesis Evangelion to write a novel, something he had been thinking of doing since he was in high school. Nasu originally wrote Mahōtsukai no Yoru on the spur of the moment as a roughly 400-page novel in winter 1996. He tried to enter it into several writing competitions, but was ultimately unsuccessful, leaving the work merely being passed around by his friends. Later, Nasu planned to submit it to Fujimi Shobo, but had difficulty keeping the page count under 350 pages, and left the novel unreleased. After forming Type-Moon with Takashi Takeuchi and releasing several projects under it, Takeuchi suggested remaking Mahōtsukai no Yoru so it could be released before their next planned project Girls' Work.

In April 2008, a game version of Mahōtsukai no Yoru was announced. Unlike Type-Moon's previous games, Mahōtsukai no Yoru is not an adult game, and features Hirokazu Koyama as the lead artist in place of Takeuchi. The game was set to be released sometime in 2009, but after several delays, the game received a September 2010 release date. In September, however, Type-Moon announced that the release date had been pushed back to winter 2011, and later to sometime in 2011. A free game demo was made available on December 15, 2011, and the full game was released on April 12, 2012 for Windows PCs.

An enhanced version for Nintendo Switch and PlayStation 4 was announced in April 2022, and published by Aniplex on December 8, 2022 in Japan. A demo version was released on November 3, 2022. In June 2022, it was confirmed that the game would also launch worldwide under the title Witch on the Holy Night on the same date. It features a higher resolution than the original PC release and full voice acting along with English, Simplified Chinese and Traditional Chinese language options.

Two visual novel sequels are planned by Type-Moon, though no updates have been made since 2012.

Music
The game's three disc original soundtrack was released on May 9, 2012, composed by Hideyuki Fukasawa and Keita Haga. A two disc arrangement album featuring tracks from the game titled WITCH ON THE HOLY NIGHT ORIGINAL SOUNDTRACK REPETITION was released on December 29, 2013.

Witch on the Holy Night's ending theme song is "Hoshi ga Matataku Konna Yoru ni" (星が瞬くこんな夜に) by Supercell, and was released with the game's soundtrack.

Film adaptation
In December 2021 it was announced that the game will be adapted into an anime film produced by Ufotable, and will be released in late 2023.

References

External links
PC version Official website 
Console version Official website 
Console version Official English website
Anime movie Official website 

2012 video games
Nintendo Switch games
PlayStation 4 games
Type-Moon
Video games developed in Japan
Video game prequels
Video games scored by Hideyuki Fukasawa
Visual novels
Windows games